The Felice Brothers is The Felice Brothers' fifth album and their first major release. It was released on March 4, 2008, and includes five tracks previously released on their hard-to-find Adventures of the Felice Brothers Vol. 1.

Reception

The Felice Brothers received positive reviews from critics. On Metacritic, the album holds a score of 76 out of 100 based on 10 reviews, indicating "generally favorable reviews."

Track listing
"Little Ann" - 3:24
"Greatest Show On Earth" - 5:31
"Frankie's Gun!" - 4:06
"Goddamn You, Jim" - 3:25
"Wonderful Life" - 4:04
"Don't Wake The Scarecrow" - 4:57
"Take This Bread" - 4:51
"Saint Stephen's End" - 4:03
"Love Me Tenderly" - 3:40
"Ruby Mae" - 4:08
"Murder By Mistletoe" - 4:41
"Whiskey In My Whiskey" - 3:49
"Helen Fry" - 5:44
"Radio Song" - 3:51
"Tip Your Way" - 5:23

References

2008 albums
The Felice Brothers albums
Loose Music albums
Team Love Records albums